Pohjola (from  'base, bottom', but used in derived forms like pohjois- to mean 'north' + - 'place'), sometimes just Pohja, is a location in Finnish mythology. It is one of the two main polarities in the Finnish national epic, the Kalevala, along with Kalevala or Väinölä.

Pohjola and the Kalevala storytellers 
C. Ganander (1789), characterised Pohjola as
 'the most extreme North ... a dark and terrible place. Tartarus and Ultima Thule'.
Yttersta Norden, beskrives såsom en mörk och förfärlig ort. Tartarus & ultima Thule

Attempts to treat Pohjola as a non-mythic place 
Elias Lönnrot, one of the principal collectors of Finnish folk lyric poetry and composer of the Kalevala, went to some lengths to interpret Pohjola as a real place, considering whether its inhabitants might be Saami or Finns, and precisely where areas such as Luotela / Luode ('North-West region'), Pimentola ('region of darkness'), Sariola, and Untamola / Uni ('region of sleep') might be; many other scholars followed his lead.

However, the idea of an otherworldly far north is a widespread motif in both Classical and medieval European literature, and has a corresponding concept, boasso, in Saami culture.  Thus Pohjola can be thought of as a purely abstract place, a literary trope standing as the source of evil – a foreboding, horrible, forever cold land in the far north.

Pohjola in the Kalevala tales 
In The Kalevala, Pohjola mainly appears as the home of women whom the male heroes, from the land of Kalevala, seek as wives.
The Mistress of Pohjola is Louhi, a powerful, evil witch. The great smith Seppo Ilmarinen forges the Sampo at her demand as a payment for the hand of her daughter in marriage.
The Sampo is a magic artefact, possibly a mill of plenty that churns out abundant goods, like the Cornucopia. Its exact nature is unclear, but its churning lid has also been interpreted as a symbol of the celestial vault of the heavens: Embedded with stars, it revolves around a central axis, or the pillar of the world.

Other Kalevala characters also seek marriage with the daughters of Pohjola. These include the adventurer Lemminkäinen, and the wise old man Väinämöinen. Louhi demands from them deeds similar to the forging of Sampo, such as shooting the Swan of Tuonela. When the suitor finally gets the daughter, weddings and great drinking and eating parties are held at the great hall of Pohjola.

The foundation of the world pillar, also thought of as the root of the "world tree", was probably located in Pohjola, somewhere just over the northern horizon from the Finnish mythological perspective. The pillar was thought to rest on the Pohjantähti or North Star.

The bulk of the Kalevala are the stories about the Sampo, kept in Pojola. The major episodes in the Pojola series are:
 The forging of the Sampo and its abundance hoarded by the witch Louhi inside a great mountain, in the dark reaches of Pohjola.
 The struggles of the southern people and their raid of Pohjola to seize the Sampo for their own needs.
 The Sampo being broken in the course of the struggle over it, and the loss of its all-important lid (which implies shattering the world tree at the north pole).

In music
Pohjola's Daughter is a symphonic tone poem by Jean Sibelius.

The Finnish metal band Sentenced used the frozen land of Pohjola as inspiration for the albums Journey to Pohjola and North from Here released in 1992 and 1993.

Pohjola is also the name of a song on an album Unsung Heroes by a Finnish folk metal band Ensiferum. The lyrics are based on a poem by 19th century freiherr and politician Yrjö Koskinen.

The Finnish folk metal band Moonsorrow has a song entitled "Taistelu Pohjolasta" ("The Battle for Pohjola"). Two different versions of it appear on their 1999 demo Tämä ikuinen talvi (This Eternal Winter) and their 2008 EP Tulimyrsky (Firestorm).

Other uses
In modern Finnish, the word Pohjola or Pohjoismaat is used to refer to the Nordic countries, the equivalent of which in Scandinavian languages is Norden. Pohjola is occasionally translated in English as Northland or Pohjoland.

The anime series Little Witch Academia has an episode entitled "Pohjola's Ordeal".

Footnotes

References

Finnish mythology
Karelian-Finnish folklore